Gartnavel Hospital could mean:

 Gartnavel General Hospital, a teaching hospital in the West End of Glasgow, Scotland
 Gartnavel Royal Hospital, a mental hospital on the same site as the above